The following are the winners of the 2nd annual (1975) Origins Award, presented at Origins 1976:

Charles Roberts Awards

Adventure Gaming Hall of Fame Inductee
 James F. Dunnigan

External links
 1975 Origins Awards Winners

1975 awards
 
1975 awards in the United States